Highway 31 (AR 31, Ark. 31 and Hwy. 31) is a north–south state highway in Central Arkansas. The route of  runs from U.S. Route 79B (US 79B) near Pine Bluff north across US 165, US 70, Interstate 40 (I-40) and US 64/US 67/US 167 (Future Interstate 57 {I-57}) before terminating at Highway 5 near Romance.

Route description
The highway begins north of Pine Bluff at US 79B and runs north to intersect Highway 15 near Sherrill. Continuing north of this junction Highway 31 passes the Tucker Unit and passes through farm fields before it enters Lonoke County. The route passes the Walls Farm Barn and Corn Crib, listed on the National Register of Historic Places (NRHP) north of Tomberlin before it has a short concurrency with US 165 through Coy (a rare officially designated exception). Highway 31 continues north through farmland, intersecting Highway 232 at Blakemore before forming a concurrency with US 70 south of Lonoke.

The US 70/AR 31 overlap continues into downtown Lonoke, ending when Highway 31 turns north along Center Street near the Rock Island Depot and Joe P. Eagle and D. R. Boone Building. Highway 31 serves as the western border of the county courthouse square containing the Lonoke Confederate Monument and Lonoke County Courthouse. The highway continues north to a junction with Highway 89S (3rd Street) before an interchange with Interstate 40 in north Lonoke.

Now running as a major collector of rural routes Highway 31 has a junction with Highway 236 near Woodlawn and the Woodlawn School Building on the NRHP. Minor rural intersections with Highway 321S, Highway 38, and Highway 267 are also south of Beebe. Once the route enters Beebe a concurrency forms with US 67B as Main Street, an officially designated exception. US 67B/AR 31 passes NRPHP-listed properties Beebe Theater, Staggs-Huffaker Building, Powell Clothing Store, Laws-Jarvis House, and the Smith-Moore House as a narrow two-lane undivided road through Beebe. In north Beebe the concurrency ends at a junction with US 64/US 67/US 167 (Future Interstate 57), a fully controlled-access highway.

Highway 31 exits Beebe to the northwest and has junction with Highway 321, Highway 321S, Highway 267 and Highway 267S before entering Antioch. Further northwest of Antioch the highway enters Floyd and passes the NRHP-listed Ackins House, Cotton Gin, and L. D. Hutchinson House on its way to Romance. In Romance Highway 31 intersects a road which leads to the Pence-Carmichael Farm, Barn and Root Cellar before terminating at Highway 5.

History
Highway 31 was one of the original Arkansas state highways when the system was first numbered in 1926. The route ran from Sherrill north roughly along its current routing, terminating at Beebe.

Major intersections

Mile markers reset at concurrencies.

See also

 List of state highways in Arkansas

References

External links

031
Transportation in Jefferson County, Arkansas
Transportation in Lonoke County, Arkansas
Transportation in White County, Arkansas